Roxanne Vincenta Modafferi (born September 24, 1982) is an American retired mixed martial artist, who most recently fought for the UFC. Though she last fought in the flyweight division, she has fought in multiple weight classes in her career. A professional competitor since 2003, she is considered one of the pioneers of women's MMA.

Biography
Modafferi is of Italian and Lithuanian descent. Modafferi's training began in Taekwondo at the age of 13 in Pennsylvania, moving on to Mark Lawler's Kenpō Karate in the high school. She then began attending the Dalton Judo Club in Pittsfield, Massachusetts. Her description of that experience was: "I thought I was all cool doing Karate, like the movie stars, but then in Judo I learned what it was like to fly." She trained for three years to gain a brown belt in the style, and then graduated from Lenox Memorial High School. Before leaving home to study at the University of Massachusetts Amherst, a fellow brown belt brought Modafferi to a Royce Gracie Brazilian Jiu Jitsu association in Adams, Massachusetts, where she trained intensively for three months.

Modafferi majored in Japanese Language and Literature with a minor in Linguistics at the University of Massachusetts. While at college, she found the Amherst Athletic club, where New England Submission Fighting is based. In addition, she trained at another Royce Gracie association in Hartford, Connecticut, for about a year (necessitating a weekly two-hour round trip), also investigating Jeremy Libiszewski's School of Self-Defence in Wilbraham, Massachusetts. During summer vacations in Boston, she trained at Joao Amaral's New England BJJ club, now associated with Brazilian Top Team. Modafferi says, "Those guys are tough as concrete is hard, and beat my weaknesses out of me when they found them." To work on her striking, she also attended the Sityodtong Muay Thai Academy's North American branch in Somerville, Massachusetts, run by Kru Mark DellaGrotte.

She is now a member of the Syndicate MMA team.

Mixed martial arts career

International career
Modafferi spent September 2003 to June 2004, her junior year, in Tokyo, Japan. This enabled her to compete in a number of NHB and BJJ competitions. She achieved a 3-0 mixed martial arts record in the Smackgirl promotion and defeated Jennifer Howe.

In Japan, she trained at the Cross Point club in Kichijouji, which taught both Muay Thai and BJJ. She hopes to one day write a book about her experiences during that time, having already contributed several articles on the topic. After graduating in May 2005, she secured a position with Berlitz, teaching English in Japan and arriving for the second time in July 2005.

Modafferi earned a win by split decision against Cassandra Rivers-Blasso at Fatal Femmes Fighting on February 2, 2007. She became K-GRACE Women's Open-Weight Tournament Champion by defeating Hee Jin Lee, Megumi Yabushita and Marloes Coenen on May 27, 2007.

Roxanne defended her FFF title against Vanessa Porto at FFF 4 – Call of the Wild on April 3, 2008. She won the fight by TKO in the third round.

She signed a contract with the American Fight League (AFL) and was scheduled to face Tara LaRosa at the AFL's November event, but fought instead at the debut Valkyrie event in Japan after the AFL's plans stalled.

Strikeforce
Modafferi moved up a weight class and made her long-awaited Strikeforce debut in a rematch with Marloes Coenen at Strikeforce: Fedor vs. Rogers on November 7, 2009, but lost the fight by armbar in the first round.

Independent promotions
On January 30, 2010, Modafferi submitted Molly Helsel in the second round at King of the Cage: Toryumon in Okinawa, Japan.

Modafferi rematched Tara LaRosa at Moosin: God of Martial Arts on May 21, 2010. Strikeforce provided official permission for Modafferi to compete on the card. Modafferi won the fight by split decision.

Strikeforce return
Modafferi returned to Strikeforce to challenge Sarah Kaufman at Strikeforce Challengers: del Rosario vs. Mahe on July 23, 2010. She lost the fight via knockout due to a slam in the third round.

Modafferi was released by Strikeforce on November 12, 2010, after losing both her fights with the promotion. She was scheduled to face Hitomi Akano at World Victory Road Presents: Soul of Fight on December 30, 2010, but the fight was cancelled after Modafferi suffered a stomach illness and was unable to compete.

International return
Modafferi faced Rosi Sexton at Cage Warriors Fighting Championship 40 on February 26, 2011. The fight was Modafferi's debut at 125 pounds. She was defeated by unanimous decision.

Modafferi then faced Hitomi Akano in a bout rescheduled for Jewels 15th Ring on July 9, 2011. She was defeated by unanimous decision.

Modafferi was scheduled to face Aisling Daly at BlackEye Promotions 5 in Fletcher, North Carolina on October 1, 2011. However, Daly was forced to withdraw from the card and Modafferi faced Barb Honchak instead. She was defeated by submission due to a rear-naked choke in the third round.

On February 10, 2012, it was announced that Modafferi would face Takayo Hashi at Jewels 18th Ring on March 3 in Tokyo. She was defeated by unanimous decision.

Modafferi was set to face Shizuka Sugiyama at Jewels 22nd Ring on December 15, 2012. However, she suffered a neck injury in training and withdrew from the fight on December 13.

The Ultimate Fighter 18
In August 2013, it was announced that Modafferi was one of the fighters selected to be on The Ultimate Fighter: Team Rousey vs. Team Tate. In the elimination fight to get into the TUF house, Modafferi faced Valérie Létourneau  and won via a rear-naked choke submission in the first round. She later lost her first tournament fight to Jessica Rakoczy.

Ultimate Fighting Championship
In November 2013, it was announced that Modafferi would make her official UFC debut against fellow TUF 18 alumni Raquel Pennington at The Ultimate Fighter 18 Finale on November 30. She lost the fight via unanimous decision (30-27, 30-27, 29-28).

Invicta FC
Modafferi met Tara LaRosa for the third time at Invicta FC 8 on Saturday, September 6, 2014. The event was the first Invicta event to air exclusively on UFC Fight Pass. Modafferi won the fight via unanimous decision, ending her 6 fight losing streak with her first win in four years. She followed this up with a split decision win over Andrea Lee at Invicta FC 10 on Friday, December 5, 2014.

Modafferi faced Vanessa Porto at Invicta FC 12 on Friday, April 24, 2015. She lost the fight via unanimous decision.
Modafferi faced Mariana Morais at Invicta FC 14: Evinger vs. Kianzad on Saturday, September 12, 2015, and won via TKO stoppage in the third round. Modafferi brought her Invicta FC record to 4-1 with a win over DeAnna Bennett in March 2016 at Invicta FC 16. She was later announced to be challenging Jennifer Maia for the Invicta FC Flyweight championship at Invicta FC 19 on September 23, 2016. The fight was Modafferi's first title fight in the Invicta FC promotion.

The Ultimate Fighter 26
In August 2017, it was announced that Modafferi would be one of the fighters featured on The Ultimate Fighter 26, where the process to crown the UFC's inaugural 125-pound women's champion will take place.

In the opening round, Modafferi faced Shana Dobson and won by TKO due to punches in the first round, allowing her to move on to the next stage of the competition. In the quarterfinals, Modafferi faced Emily Whitmire and won the fight via technical knockout in round one. In the semifinals, Modafferi faced Sijara Eubanks and she lost via unanimous decision after three rounds.

UFC return
Modafferi was scheduled to face fellow semifinalist Barb Honchak on December 1, 2017 at The Ultimate Fighter 26 Finale. However, on the day of the weigh in, Sijara Eubanks was pulled from the fight for kidney failure and was replaced by Modafferi to face Nicco Montaño for the Flyweight title. She lost the fight via unanimous decision. The fight earned her the Fight of the Night bonus.

The rematch between Modafferi and Barb Honchak was rescheduled to take place July 6, 2018 at The Ultimate Fighter 27 Finale.  Modafferi won the fight via technical knockout in round two.

Modafferi faced Sijara Eubanks at UFC 230 on November 3, 2018. At the weigh-ins, Eubanks  weight at 127.2 pounds, 1.2 pounds over the flyweight non-title fight limit of 126 and she was fined 20 percent of her purse, which went to her opponent Modafferi. She lost the fight via unanimous decision.

Modafferi faced Antonina Shevchenko on April 20, 2019 at UFC on ESPN+ 7. She won the fight via split decision. The victory earned Modafferi the distinction of being the first female UFC fighter to win a bout in Russia.

Modafferi was expected to face Liz Carmouche on July 20, 2019 at UFC on ESPN 4. However, Carmouche was pulled from that bout in favor of a rematch with current champion Valentina Shevchenko in August at UFC Fight Night 156. Modaffer then faced Jennifer Maia in a rematch of their 2016 Invicta FC Flyweight Championship bout, which Maia won via split decision.  At the weigh-ins, Maia weighed in at 129 pounds, 3 pounds over the women's flyweight non-title fight limit of 126. As a result she was fined 30 percent of her purse, and the bout proceeded as scheduled at a catchweight.  Modafferi lost the fight via unanimous decision.

Modafferi faced Maycee Barber on January 18, 2020 at UFC 246. Modafferi won the one-sided fight by unanimous decision.

Modafferi faced Lauren Murphy on June 20, 2020 at UFC Fight Night: Blaydes vs. Volkov. She lost the fight by unanimous decision.

Modafferi faced  Andrea Lee on September 12, 2020 at UFC Fight Night 177. She won the fight via unanimous decision.

Modafferi was briefly scheduled to face Viviane Araújo on January 30, 2021 at UFC on ESPN 20. However, the fight was rescheduled and took place 10 days earlier at UFC Fight Night 185 instead. She lost the fight via unanimous decision.

Modafferi was scheduled to face Taila Santos on May 8, 2021 at UFC on ESPN 24. However, Modafferi was forced to pull out from the event citing a  meniscus tear.

Modafferi was expected to face Tatiana Suarez on September 25, 2021 at UFC 266. However, Suarez was pulled from the event due to injury, and she was replaced by Taila Santos She lost the fight via unanimous decision.

Modafferi faced Casey O'Neill on February 12, 2022 at UFC 271. On November 4, 2021, she announced via Instagram that this would be her final MMA fight. She lost the fight via split decision and retired. 19 out of 19 media scores gave it to O'Neill.

Professional grappling career
On October 25, 2020, Modafferi faced Danielle Kelly in the main event of Submission Hunter Pro 60 for the inaugural 130lbs no gi title and was submitted with a toehold.

Modafferi was given the opportunity to challenge Amanda Loewen for the SUG absolute title at Submission Underground 21 on March 28th, 2021. Neither woman was able to win during regulation time and the match went to EBI overtime, with Loewen winning by armbar at 0:59 of the first round of overtime.

Modafferi faced Michele Oliveira in a superfight at UFC Fightpass Invitational 2 on July 3, 2022 and lost a decision.

Writing
Modafferri writes a regular column titled Dear Roxy for MMA website Bloody Elbow. She is also an author and has two published two books, How to be Positive: Mental Training by the Happy Warrior and Memoirs of a Happy Warrior.

Championships and accomplishments

Mixed martial arts
Ultimate Fighting Championship
Fight of the Night (One time) vs. Nicco Montaño
Second most fights in the UFC Women's Flyweight division history (ten)
2020 Upset of the Year vs. Maycee Barber
 International Sport Karate Association
 ISKA Women's World Middleweight Championship (One time)
 International Fighting Championships
 IFC Women's Middleweight Championship (One time)
 Fatal Femmes Fighting
 FFF Women's Lightweight Championship (two times)
 K-GRACE
 K-GRACE Women's Openweight Tournament Winner
 Smackgirl
 Smackgirl World ReMix 2004 Openweight Tournament Semifinalist
 AwakeningFighters.com WMMA Awards
 2014 Flyweight of the Year
Sherdog
2020 Upset of the Year vs. Maycee Barber

Submission grappling
 North American Grappling Association
 2002 NAGA Fighter of the Year
 Abu Dhabi Combat Club
 2005 ADCC Submission Wrestling World Championships -60 kg Quarterfinalist

Mixed martial arts record

|-
|Loss
|align=center|25–20
|Casey O'Neill
|Decision (split)
|UFC 271
|
|align=center|3
|align=center|5:00
|Houston, Texas, United States
||
|-
|Loss
|align=center|25–19
|Taila Santos
|Decision (unanimous)
|UFC 266
|
|align=center|3
|align=center|5:00
|Las Vegas, Nevada, United States
|
|-
|Loss
|align=center|25–18
|Viviane Araújo
|Decision (unanimous)
|UFC on ESPN: Chiesa vs. Magny
|
|align=center|3
|align=center|5:00
|Abu Dhabi, United Arab Emirates
|
|-
|Win
|align=center|25–17
|Andrea Lee
|Decision (unanimous)
|UFC Fight Night: Waterson vs. Hill
|
|align=center|3
|align=center|5:00
|Las Vegas, Nevada, United States
|
|-
|Loss
|align=center|24–17
|Lauren Murphy
|Decision (unanimous)
|UFC on ESPN: Blaydes vs. Volkov 
|
|align=center|3
|align=center|5:00
|Las Vegas, Nevada, United States
| 
|-
|Win
|align=center|24–16
|Maycee Barber
|Decision (unanimous)
|UFC 246 
|
|align=center|3
|align=center|5:00
|Las Vegas, Nevada, United States
| 
|-
|Loss
|align=center|23–16
|Jennifer Maia
|Decision (unanimous)
|UFC on ESPN: dos Anjos vs. Edwards 
|
|align=center|3
|align=center|5:00
|San Antonio, Texas, United States
|
|-
|Win
|align=center|23–15
|Antonina Shevchenko
|Decision (split)
|UFC Fight Night: Overeem vs. Oleinik 
|
|align=center|3
|align=center|5:00
|Saint Petersburg, Russia
|
|-
|Loss
|align=center|22–15
|Sijara Eubanks
|Decision (unanimous)
|UFC 230 
|
|align=center|3
|align=center|5:00
|New York City, New York, United States
|
|-
|Win
|align=center|22–14
|Barb Honchak
|TKO (elbows)
|The Ultimate Fighter: Undefeated Finale 
|
|align=center|2
|align=center|3:32
|Las Vegas, Nevada, United States
|
|- 
|Loss
|align=center|21–14
|Nicco Montaño
|Decision (unanimous)
|The Ultimate Fighter: A New World Champion Finale 
|
|align=center|5
|align=center|5:00
|Las Vegas, Nevada, United States
|
|-
| Win
| align=center | 21–13
| Sarah D'Alelio
| TKO (elbows)
| Invicta FC 23: Porto vs. Niedźwiedź
| 
| align=center | 3
| align=center | 1:37
| Kansas City, Missouri, United States
|
|-
| Win
| align=center | 20–13
| Priscila de Souza
| Submission (armbar)
| Fusion Fight League: Ladies Fight Night
| 
| align=center | 2
| align=center | 4:52
| Billings, Montana, United States
|
|-
| Loss
| align=center | 19–13
| Jennifer Maia
| Decision (split)
| Invicta FC 19: Maia vs. Modafferi
| 
| align=center | 5
| align=center | 5:00
| Kansas City, Missouri, United States
|
|-
| Win
| align=center | 19–12
| DeAnna Bennett
| Decision (split)
| Invicta FC 16: Hamasaki vs. Brown
| 
| align=center | 3
| align=center | 5:00
| Las Vegas, Nevada, United States
|
|-
| Win
| align=center | 18–12
| Mariana Morais
| TKO (punches)
| Invicta FC 14: Evinger vs. Kianzad
| 
| align=center | 3
| align=center | 4:40
| Kansas City, Missouri, United States
|
|-
| Loss
| align=center | 17–12
| Vanessa Porto
| Decision (unanimous)
| Invicta FC 12: Kankaanpää vs. Souza
| 
| align=center | 3
| align=center | 5:00
| Kansas City, Missouri, United States
|
|-
| Win
| align=center | 17–11
| Andrea Lee
| Decision (split)
| Invicta FC 10: Waterson vs. Tiburcio
| 
| align=center | 3
| align=center | 5:00
| Houston, Texas, United States
|
|-
| Win
| align=center | 16–11
| Tara LaRosa
| Decision (unanimous)
| Invicta FC 8: Waterson vs. Tamada
| 
| align=center | 3
| align=center | 5:00
| Kansas City, Missouri, United States
|
|-
| Loss
| align=center | 15–11
| Raquel Pennington
| Decision (unanimous)
| The Ultimate Fighter: Team Rousey vs. Team Tate Finale
| 
| align=center | 3
| align=center | 5:00
| Las Vegas, Nevada, United States
|
|-
| Loss
| align=center | 15–10
| Takayo Hashi
| Decision (unanimous)
| Jewels 18th Ring
| 
| align=center | 2
| align=center | 5:00
| Koto, Japan
|
|-
| Loss
| align=center | 15–9
| Barb Honchak
| Submission (rear-naked choke)
| BEP 5: Breast Cancer Beatdown
| 
| align=center | 3
| align=center | 1:46
| Fletcher, North Carolina, United States
|
|-
| Loss
| align=center | 15–8
| Hitomi Akano
| Decision (unanimous)
| Jewels 15th Ring
| 
| align=center | 2
| align=center | 5:00
| Kabukicho, Japan
|
|-
| Loss
| align=center | 15–7
| Rosi Sexton
| Decision (unanimous)
| Cage Warriors: 40
| 
| align=center | 3
| align=center | 5:00
| North London, England
| 
|-
| Loss
| align=center | 15–6
| Sarah Kaufman
| KO (slam)
| Strikeforce Challengers: del Rosario vs. Mahe
| 
| align=center | 3
| align=center | 4:45
| Everett, Washington, United States
| 
|-
| Win
| align=center | 15–5
| Tara LaRosa
| Decision (split)
| Moosin: God of Martial Arts
| 
| align=center | 3
| align=center | 5:00
| Worcester, Massachusetts, United States
|
|-
| Win
| align=center | 14–5
| Molly Helsel
| Submission (rear-naked choke)
| KOTC: Toryumon
| 
| align=center | 2
| align=center | 3:18
| Okinawa, Japan
|
|-
| Loss
| align=center | 13–5
| Marloes Coenen
| Submission (armbar)
| Strikeforce: Fedor vs. Rogers
| 
| align=center | 1
| align=center | 1:05
| Hoffman Estates, Illinois, United States
|
|-
| Win
| align=center | 13–4
| Chisa Yonezawa
| Decision (unanimous)
| Valkyrie 01
| 
| align=center | 2
| align=center | 3:00
| Tokyo, Japan
|
|-
| Win
| align=center | 12–4
| Vanessa Porto
| TKO (knees)
| Fatal Femmes Fighting 4: Call of the Wild
| 
| align=center | 3
| align=center | 0:53
| Los Angeles, California, United States
| 
|-
| Win
| align=center | 11–4
| Marloes Coenen
| Decision (split)
| K-GRACE 1
| 
| align=center | 2
| align=center | 3:00
| Tokyo, Japan
| 
|-
| Win
| align=center | 10–4
| Megumi Yabushita
| Decision (unanimous)
| K-GRACE 1
| 
| align=center | 2
| align=center | 3:00
| Tokyo, Japan
| 
|-
| Win
| align=center | 9–4
| Hee Jin Lee
| Submission (armbar)
| K-GRACE 1
| 
| align=center | 1
| align=center | 2:56
| Tokyo, Japan
| 
|-
| Win
| align=center | 8–4
| Cassandra Rivers-Blasso
| Decision (split)
| Fatal Femmes Fighting 1: Asian Invasion
| 
| align=center | 5
| align=center | 2:00
| Los Angeles, California, United States
| 
|-
| Loss
| align=center | 7–4
| Shayna Baszler
| Submission (hammerlock)
| MARS: BodogFIGHT
| 
| align=center | 1
| align=center | 1:08
| Tokyo, Japan
|
|-
| Win
| align=center | 7–3
| Megumi Yabushita
| Decision (unanimous)
| G-Shooto: G-Shooto 05
| 
| align=center | 2
| align=center | 5:00
| Tokyo, Japan
|
|-
| Loss
| align=center | 6–3
| Tara LaRosa
| Decision (unanimous)
| Mix Fighting Championships: Boardwalk Blitz
| 
| align=center | 3
| align=center | 5:00
| Atlantic City, New Jersey, United States
|
|-
| Loss
| align=center | 6–2
| Laura D'Auguste
| Decision (unanimous)
| Ring of Combat 8
| 
| align=center | 3
| align=center | 5:00
| Asbury Park, New Jersey, United States
| 
|-
| Win
| align=center | 6–1
| Jennifer Howe
| Submission (triangle choke)
| International Fighting Championships: Eve of Destruction
| 
| align=center | 3
| align=center | 1:47
| Salt Lake City, Utah, United States
| 
|-
| Loss
| align=center | 5–1
| Megumi Yabushita
| Decision (unanimous)
| Smackgirl: World ReMix 2004
| 
| align=center | 2
| align=center | 5:00
| Shizuoka, Japan
| 
|-
| Win
| align=center | 5–0
| Ana Carolina
| Decision (unanimous)
| Smackgirl: World ReMix 2004
| 
| align=center | 2
| align=center | 5:00
| Shizuoka, Japan
| 
|-
| Win
| align=center | 4–0
| Jennifer Howe
| Decision (unanimous)
| HOOKnSHOOT: Evolution
| 
| align=center | 3
| align=center | 5:00
| Evansville, Indiana, United States
|
|-
| Win
| align=center | 3–0
| Natsuko Kikukawa
| Decision (unanimous)
| Smackgirl: F8
| 
| align=center | 3
| align=center | 5:00
| Tokyo, Japan
|
|-
| Win
| align=center | 2–0
| Keiko Tamai
| Decision (unanimous)
| Greatest Common Multiple: Cross Section 1
| 
| align=center | 2
| align=center | 5:00
| Japan
|
|-
| Win
| align=center | 1–0
| Hikaru Shinohara
| Submission (armbar)
| Smackgirl: Third Season 7
| 
| align=center | 1
| align=center | 1:58
| Tokyo, Japan
|

|-
| Loss
| align=center | 3–2
| Sijara Eubanks
| Decision (unanimous)
| rowspan=3|The Ultimate Fighter: A New World Champion
|  (air date)
| align=center | 3
| align=center | 5:00
| rowspan=3|Las Vegas, Nevada, United States
| 
|-
| Win
| align=center | 3–1
| Emily Whitmire
| TKO (elbows)
|  (air date)
| align=center | 1
| align=center | 4:59
| 
|-
| Win
| align=center | 2–1
| Shana Dobson
| TKO (elbows)
|  (air date)
| align=center | 1
| align=center | 1:37
| 
|-
| Loss
| align=center | 1–1
| Jessica Rakoczy
| TKO (slam and punches)
| rowspan=2|The Ultimate Fighter: Team Rousey vs. Team Tate
|  (air date)
| align=center | 2
| align=center | 2:31
| rowspan=2|Las Vegas, Nevada, United States
| 
|-
| Win
| align=center | 1–0
| Valérie Létourneau
| Submission (rear-naked choke)
|  (air date)
| align=center | 1
| align=center | 3:36
|

See also
 List of female mixed martial artists

References

External links
 
 

1982 births
American female mixed martial artists
Mixed martial artists from Delaware
Sportspeople from Wilmington, Delaware
American practitioners of Brazilian jiu-jitsu
People awarded a black belt in Brazilian jiu-jitsu
American female judoka
Female Brazilian jiu-jitsu practitioners
American people of Italian descent
American people of Lithuanian descent
Wajitsu Keishukai
American expatriate sportspeople in Japan
University of Massachusetts Amherst College of Humanities and Fine Arts alumni
Living people
Flyweight mixed martial artists
Bantamweight mixed martial artists
Mixed martial artists utilizing American Kenpo
Mixed martial artists utilizing judo
Mixed martial artists utilizing Brazilian jiu-jitsu
Ultimate Fighting Championship female fighters
21st-century American women